Hybomitra lurida  is a species of horse-fly in the family Tabanidae. It is found across central and Northern Europe and Asia. It is a large fly, between 12–15 millimetres long.

The grown flies fly in summer, from May to June. They prefer open landscapes, in forests and mountains. Usually, they stay around cattle.

References

External links 
Martin C. Harvey , 2018 Key to genus Hybomitra
 Norsk Entomologisk forening – More information on insects.

Tabanidae
Diptera of Europe
Diptera of Asia
Insects described in 1817
Taxa named by Carl Fredrik Fallén